Two ships of the Royal New Zealand Navy have been named HMNZS Canterbury after the Canterbury region of New Zealand:

 , was a Leander-class frigate that served from 1971 to 2005, and was sunk as a dive wreck in 2007.
 , a sealift ship commissioned in 2007.

Royal New Zealand Navy ship names